Gamiz may refer to:

Gamiz (surname)
Gámiz, Álava, a village in Basque Country, Spain
Gamiz, a former parish, now part of Gamiz-Fika, a town in Basque Country, Spain